The Body of Christ Church ( is a Roman Catholic church in Visby on the Swedish island of Gotland. Inaugurated by Bishop Hubertus Brandenburg in 1982, it is the first Catholic church to be built on Gotland since the Middle Ages. The relatively small church has space for around 80 worshippers at a time.

References

Churches in Gotland County
Roman Catholic churches in Sweden
Visby